Didymascella is a genus of fungi belonging to the family Hemiphacidiaceae.

The species of this genus are found in Europe and Northern America.

Species:

Didymascella chamaecyparidis 
Didymascella juniperi 
Didymascella oxycedri 
Didymascella tetramicrospora 
Didymascella tetraspora 
Didymascella thujina

References

Helotiales
Helotiales genera